In the Ottoman Empire, a millet was an independent court of law pertaining to "personal law" under which a confessional community (a group abiding by the laws of Muslim Sharia, Christian Canon law, or Jewish Halakha) was allowed to rule itself under its own laws.

Despite frequently being referred to as a "system", before the nineteenth century the organization of what are now retrospectively called millets in the Ottoman Empire was not at all systematic. Rather, non-Muslims were simply given a significant degree of autonomy within their own community, without an overarching structure for the 'millet' as a whole. The notion of distinct millets corresponding to different religious communities within the empire would not emerge until the eighteenth century. Subsequently, the existence of the millet system was justified through numerous foundation myths linking it back to the time of Sultan Mehmed the Conqueror (r. 1451–81), although it is now understood that no such system existed in the fifteenth century.

During the 19th century rise of nationalism in the Ottoman Empire, as result of the Tanzimat reforms (1839–76), the term was used for legally protected ethno-linguistic minority groups, similar to the way other countries use the word nation. The word millet comes from the Arabic word millah (ملة) and literally means "nation". Abdulaziz Sachedina regards the millet system as an example of pre-modern religious pluralism, as the state recognized multiple different religious groups in exchange for some control over religious identification and the enforcement of orthodoxy.

Johann Strauss, author of "A Constitution for a Multilingual Empire: Translations of the Kanun-ı Esasi and Other Official Texts into Minority Languages", wrote that the term "seems to be so essential for the understanding of the Ottoman
system and especially the status of non-Muslims". Other authors interpret the millet system as one form of non-territorial autonomy and consider it as such a potentially universal solution to the modern issues of ethnic and religious diversity.

Term 

The term millet, which originates from the Arabic milla, had three basic meanings in Ottoman Turkish: religion, religious community and nation. The first sense derives from Quranic usage and is attested in Ottoman administrative documents into the 19th century. Benjamin Braude has argued that before the period of 19th-century Tanzimat reforms, the word millet in the sense of religious community denoted the Muslim religious community or the Christians outside of the Ottoman Empire. This view is supported by Donald Quataert. In contrast, Michael Ursinus writes that the word was used to refer to non-Muslim subjects of the Ottoman Empire even before that time. The term was used inconsistently prior to the 19th century.

The systematic use of millet as designation for non-Muslim Ottoman communities dates from the reign of Sultan Mahmud II in the early 19th century, when official documentation came to reiterate that non-Muslim subjects were organized into three officially sanctioned millets: Greek Orthodox, Armenian and Jewish. The bureaucrats of this era asserted that the millet system was a tradition dating back to the reign of Sultan Mehmed I. Many historians have accepted this claim and assumed that a millet system of this form existed since early Ottoman times. Recent scholarship has cast doubt on this idea, showing that it was rather a later political innovation, which was introduced in the rhetorical garb of an ancient tradition. The Ottoman state used religion rather than ethnicity to define each millet, and people who study the Ottoman Empire do not define the Muslims as being in a millet.

The Ottoman Turkish version of the Ottoman Constitution of 1876 uses the word "millet", as do the Arabic and Persian versions; despite this, at the time the usage of the Arabic word "milla" was declining in favour of the word "ummah".

The Armenian, Greek, and Jewish residents did not use the word "millet" and instead described themselves as nations (Armenian: ազգ (azg), Greek: Έθνος (ethnos), and Ladino: nasyon). The lack of use of the word "millet" among the Christian and Jewish minorities reflected in versions of the Ottoman Constitution in their respective languages: The French version of the Ottoman Constitution used the word "communauté" in the place of "millet", and so the others used words modeled after or based on the French: հասարակութիւն (hasarakut‘iwn) in Armenian, obština (now Общност) in Bulgarian, κοινότης (koinotēs), in Greek, and komunita in Judaeo-Spanish.

Concept 

The millet system is closely linked to Islamic rules on the treatment of non−Muslim minorities living under Islamic dominion (dhimmi). The Ottoman term specifically refers to the separate legal courts pertaining to personal law under which minorities were allowed to rule themselves (in cases not involving any Muslim) with fairly little interference from the Ottoman government.

People were bound to their millets by their religious affiliations (or their confessional communities), rather than their ethnic origins, according to the millet concept (excepting the Armenian case, until the modern era). The millets had a great deal of power – they set their own laws and collected and distributed their own taxes. All that was required was loyalty to the Empire. When a member of one millet committed a crime against a member of another, the law of the injured party applied, but the ruling Islamic majority being paramount, any dispute involving a Muslim fell under their sharia−based law.

Later, the perception of the millet concept was altered in the 19th century by the rise of nationalism within the Ottoman Empire.

Millets 
Although the Ottoman administration of non-Muslim subjects was not uniform until the 19th century and varied according to region and group, it is possible to identify some common patterns for earlier epochs. Christian and Jewish communities were granted a large degree of autonomy. Tax collection, education, legal and religious affairs of these communities were administered by their own leaders. This enabled the Ottomans to rule over diverse peoples with "a minimum of resistance". The Jewish community, in particular, was able to prosper under the Ottoman rule and its ranks were swelled with the arrival of Jews who were expelled from Spain. At the same time, non-Muslims were subject to several forms of discrimination and excluded from the Ottoman ruling elite. Armenians formed three millets under the Ottoman rule. A wide array of other groups such as Catholics, Karaites and Samaritans was also represented.

Orthodox Christians 

The Orthodox Christians were included in the Rum Millet (millet-i Rûm) or the "Roman nation", and enjoyed a certain autonomy. It was named after Roman ("Byzantine") subjects of the Ottoman Empire, but Orthodox Greeks, Bulgarians, Albanians, Georgians, Arabs, Aromanians, Megleno-Romanians, and Serbs were all considered part of the same millet despite their differences in ethnicity and language and despite the fact that the religious hierarchy was dominated by the Greeks. Nevertheless, ethnonyms never disappeared and some form of ethnic identity was preserved as evident from a Sultan's Firman from 1680, that lists the ethnic groups on the Balkans as follows: Greeks (Rum), Albanians (Arnaut), Serbs (Sirf), "Vlachs" (Eflak, referring to the Aromanians and Megleno-Romanians), and Bulgarians (Bulgar).

The Ecumenical Patriarch was recognized as the highest religious and political leader (millet-bashi, or ethnarch) of all Eastern Orthodox subjects of the Sultan, though in certain periods some major powers, such as Russia (under the 1774 Treaty of Küçük Kaynarca), or Britain claimed the rights of protection over the Ottoman Empire's Orthodox subjects. The Serbian Patriarchate of Peć and the Archbishopric of Ohrid which were autonomous Orthodox Churches under the tutelage of the Ecumenical Patriarch were taken over by the Greek Phanariotes during the 18th century, in 1766 and 1767 respectively.

Armenians 

Until the 19th century, there was a single Armenian millet which served all ethnic Armenians irrespective of whether they belonged to the Armenian Apostolic Church, the Armenian Catholic Church, or the Armenian Protestant Church (which was formed in the 19th century). Besides a religious role, this millet also played a political and cultural role. Namely, it bundled together all Armenian and some other groups, showcasing a shift from religious identity towards national identity. As a result of this, a type of hegemony emerged in which all groups that were under this millet had to conform to the norms imposed by the leader of the millet, who was appointed by the sultan. This had a cultural, political, linguistic, and religious effect on all of these groups. Only later did separate Catholic millets emerge. Non-Armenians from churches which were theologically linked to the Armenian Church (by virtue of being non-Chalcedonians) were under the authority of the Armenian Patriarchate, although they maintained a separate hierarchy with their own Patriarchs; these groups included the Syriac Orthodox and the Copts.

Süryaniler/Syriac Christians  
Asuri (Assyrian) or Nestorian Syriacs

Assyrians are referred to as 'Asuri' in the Turkish vernacular, Assyrians split by Christian sect were thus treated as separate ethnic groups for the Ottoman government. The Church of the East largely identifies as Assyrian, but the liturgical language is called Syriac, hence multiple 'millets' for Syriac speaking Assyrians arose as a consequence of the separation by Church affiliation, as was required by 19th century Ottoman law.

Syriac Catholics

The Syriac Catholic community was recognized as its own millet in 1829.

Chaldeans

The Chaldean community was recognized as its own millet in 1844.

Syriac Orthodox

Main article: Syriac Orthodox Christians (Middle East)

The Syriac Orthodox community in the Ottoman Empire was for long not recognized as its own millet, but part of the Armenian millet (under the Armenian Patriarch). This meant that the Syriac Orthodox were subject to the hegemony of the Armenians, linguistically, culturally, politically, and religiously. Then, during the Tanzimat reforms (1839–78), the Syriac Orthodox were granted independent status with the recognition of their own millet in 1873.

Jews 

Under the millet system the Jews were organized as a community on the basis of religion, alongside the other millets (e.g. Eastern Orthodox millet, Armenian millet, etc.). They were the most geographically spread group within the empire. The Ottoman Jews enjoyed similar privileges to the Christians in the Ottoman Empire. In the framework of the millet they had a considerable amount of administrative autonomy and were represented by the Hakham Bashi ( حاخامباشی), who held broad powers to legislate, judge, and enforce the laws among the Jews in the Ottoman Empire and often sat on the Sultan's divan.

The Jews, like the other millet communities of the Ottoman Empire, were still considered a people of the book and protected by the Sharia Law of Islam. However, while the Jews were not viewed in the eyes of the law to be on an equal playing field with Muslims, they were still treated relatively well at points during the Ottoman Empire. Norman Stillman explains that the prosperity of medieval Jews was closely tied to that of their Muslim governors. Stillman notes that during the time between the 9th and 13th centuries when Jewish culture blossomed, "medieval Islamic civilization was at its apogee". Given their rampant persecution in medieval Europe, many Jews looked favorably upon millet. In the late 19th century such groups as the Bilu, a group of young Russian Jews who were pioneers in the Zionist movement, proposed negotiating with the Sultan of the Ottoman Empire to allow a millet like settlement which would allow them greater independence in Palestine.

Roman Catholics 

After the fall of Constantinople, the only Latin Catholic group to be incorporated into the Sultan's domain were the Genoese who lived in the Byzantine capital. Over the next decades, Turkish armies pushed into the Balkans, overrunning the Catholic populations of Albania, Bulgaria, Bosnia and Hungary.

The Melkite Catholics gained their autonomy as a religious community in 1848 by Sultan Abdulmecid. Bruce Masters claims that Melkite Catholics insisted that they have a millet of their own, that would grant them "sense of distinctiveness".

In the Orient, the 16th century saw the Maronites of Lebanon, the Latins of Palestine, and most of the Greek islands, which once held Latin Catholic communities, come under Turkish rule. Papal response to the loss of these communities was initially a call to the crusade, but the response from the European Catholic monarchs was weak: French interest, moreover, lay in an alliance with the Turks against the Habsburgs. Furthermore, the Catholics of the Ottoman world received a protector at the Porte in the person of the French ambassador. In this way the Roman Catholic millet was established at the start of the Tanzimat reforms.

Circassians 
The high numbers of Circassians in the Ottoman Empire was mainly due to the Crimean War. During the last years of the war and the years to follow, many Circassians fled the empire through The Black Sea.  Circassians in the Ottoman Empire, despite being Muslim, mainly kept to themselves and maintained their separate identity, even having their own courts, in which they would tolerate no outside influence.

History

Use for Sassanid Empire 

In a 1910 book William Ainger Wigram used the term melet in application to the Persian Sassanid Empire, arguing that the situation there was similar to the Ottoman millet system and no other term was readily available to describe it. Some other authors have also adopted this usage. The early Christians there were forming the Church of the East (later known as the Nestorian Church after the Nestorian schism). The Church of the East's leader, the Catholicos or Patriarch of the East, was responsible to the Persian king for the Christians within the Empire. This system of maintaining the Christians as a protected religious community continued after the Islamic conquest of the Sassanids, and the community of Nestorian Christians flourished and was able to send missionaries far past the Empire's borders, reaching as far as China and India.

19th century (Reformation Era) 
In 1839 and 1856 multiple reforms were attempted with the goal of creating equality between the religious communities of the Ottoman Empire. In wake of these reforms multiple different new millets emerged, notably for multiple Eastern Catholic and Protestant Christian communities. Millets were also now to have there internal rule reviewed by the central government and clerics within the millet in order to keep their power in check. Many clerics of the millet system pushed back against these reforms as they believed it was meant to weaken millets and the specialized power they had built for themselves. These millets, refusing to withdraw there autonomy slowed down the attempted reforms and the general impact they were attempting to make on the equality of religious communities.

Reformulation into Ottomanism 

Before the turn of the 19th century, the millets had a great deal of power – they set their own laws and collected and distributed their own taxes. Tanzimat reforms aimed to encourage Ottomanism among the secessionist subject nations and stop the rise of nationalist movements within the Ottoman Empire, but failed to succeed despite trying to integrate non-Muslims and non-Turks more thoroughly into the Ottoman society with new laws and regulations. With the Tanzimat era, the regulation called "Regulation of the Armenian Nation" (Turkish: "Nizâmnâme−i Millet−i Ermeniyân") was introduced on 29 March 1863, over the Millet organization, which granted extensive privileges and autonomy concerning self−governance. The Armenian Nation, "Millet−i Ermeniyân", which is considered here, is the Armenian Orthodox Gregorian nation (millet) of that time. In a very short time, the Ottoman Empire passed another regulation over "Nizâmnâme−i Millet−i Ermeniyân" developed by the Patriarchate Assemblies of Armenians, which was named as the Islahat Fermânı (Firman of the Reforms).  The "Firman of the Reforms" gave immense privileges to the Armenians, which formed a "governance in governance" to eliminate the aristocratic dominance of the Armenian nobles by development of the political strata in the society. These two reforms, which were theoretically perfect examples of social change by law, brought serious stress over Ottoman political and administrative structure.

Effect of Protectorate of missions 

The Ottoman System lost the mechanisms of its existence from the assignment of protection of citizen rights of their subjects to other states. People were not citizens of the Ottoman Empire anymore but of other states, due to the Capitulations of the Ottoman Empire to European powers, protecting the rights of their citizens within the Empire. The Russians became formal Protectors of Eastern Orthodox groups, the French of Roman Catholics and the British of Jews and other groups.

Russia and England competed for the Armenians; the Eastern Orthodox perceived American Protestants, who had over 100 missionaries established in Anatolia by World War I, as weakening their own teaching.

These religious activities, subsidized by the governments of western nations, were not devoid of political goals, such in the case of candlestick wars of 1847, which eventually led in 1854 to the Crimean War. Tension began among the Catholic and Orthodox monks in Palestine with France channeling resources to increase its influence in the region from 1840. Repairs to shrines were important for the sects as they were linked to the possession of keys to the temples. Notes were given by the protectorates, including the French, to the Ottoman capital about the governor; he was condemned as he had to defend the Church of the Holy Sepulchre by placing soldiers inside the temple because of the candlestick wars, eliminating the change of keys. Successive Ottoman governments had issued edicts granting primacy of access to different Christian groups which vied for control of Jerusalem's holy sites.

Effect of nationalism 

Under the original design, the multi-faced structure of the millet system was unified under the house of Osman. The rise of nationalism in Europe under the influence of the French revolution had extended to the Ottoman Empire during the 19th century. Each millet became increasingly independent with the establishment of its own schools, churches, hospitals and other facilities. These activities effectively moved the Christian population outside the framework of the Ottoman political system.

The Ottoman millet system (citizenship) began to degrade with the continuous identification of the religious creed with ethnic nationality. The interaction of ideas of French revolution with the Ottoman Millet system created a breed of thought (a new form of personal identification) which turned the concept of nationalism synonymous with religion under the Ottoman flag. It was impossible to hold the system or prevent Clash of Civilizations when the Armenian national liberation movement expressed itself within the Armenian church. Patriarch Nerses Varjabedyan expresses his position on Ottoman Armenians to the British Secretary of State for Foreign Affairs, Lord Salisbury on 13 April 1878.

Post-Ottoman use 
Today a version of religion-based legal pluralism resembling the millet system still persists in varying forms in some post-Ottoman countries like Iraq, Syria, Jordan, Lebanon, Israel, the Palestinian Authority, Egypt, and Greece (for religious minorities), which observe the principle of separate personal courts and/or laws for every recognized religious community and reserved seats in the parliament. Some legal systems which developed outside the Ottoman Empire, such as those in India, Iran, Pakistan, and Bangladesh, display similar characteristics.

In Egypt for instance, the application of family law – including marriage, divorce, alimony, child custody, inheritance and burial – is based on an individual's religious beliefs. In the practice of family law, the State recognizes only the three "heavenly religions": Islam, Christianity, and Judaism. Muslim families are subject to the Personal Status Law, which draws on Sharia. Christian families are subject to canon law, and Jewish families are subject to Jewish law. In cases of family law disputes involving a marriage between a Christian woman and a Muslim man, the courts apply the Personal Status Law.

Israel, too, keeps a system based on the Ottoman-derived Millet, in which personal status is based on a person's belonging to a religious community. The state of Israel – on the basis of laws inherited from Ottoman times and retained both under British rule and by independent Israel – reserves the right to recognise some communities but not others. Thus, Orthodox Judaism is officially recognised in Israel, while Reform Rabbis and Conservative Rabbis are not recognised and cannot perform marriages. Israel recognised the Druze and Bahá'í as separate communities, which the Ottomans and British had not – due mainly to political considerations. Also, the state of Israel reserves the right to determine to which community a person belongs, and officially register him or her accordingly – even when the person concerned objects to being part of a religious community (e.g., staunch atheists of Jewish origin are registered as members of the Jewish religious community, a practice derived ultimately from the fact that the Ottoman Millet ultimately designated a person's ethnicity more than a person's beliefs).

Israeli secularists such as Shulamit Aloni and Uri Avnery often protested and called for abolition of this Ottoman remnant, and its replacement by a system modeled on that of the United States where religious affiliation is considered a person's private business in which the state should not interfere. However, all such proposals have been defeated.

Greece recognizes only a Muslim minority, and no ethnic or national minorities, such as Turks, Pomaks or Bulgarians. This is the result of several international treaties as the Convention Concerning the Exchange of Greek and Turkish Populations of 1923 and of the Treaty of Lausanne of 1924, when the old millet categories were used for the population exchanges of the Greek Orthodox Christians from Turkey (except from Istanbul, and the isles of Gökçeada and Bozcaada) and Muslims from Greece (except from Western Thrace), as well as for the protection of the two remaining recognized minorities, the "Muslims of Western Thrace" (Turks, Pomaks and Roms) and the "Greek Orthodox of Istanbul". In 1924 upon the League of Nations' demand, a bilateral Bulgarian-Greek agreement was signed, known as the Politis–Kalfov Protocol, recognizing the "Greek Slavophones" as Bulgarians and guaranteeing their protection. On 2 February 1925, the Greek parliament, claiming pressure from the Kingdom of Yugoslavia, which threatened to renounce the treaty about the Greek–Serbian Alliance of 1913, refused to ratify the agreement, that lasted until 10 June 1925. In 1927 Mollov–Kafantaris population exchange agreement was signed and the bulk of the Slavic-speaking population in Greece left for Bulgaria.

Current meaning of the word 
Today, the word "millet" means "nation" or "people" in Turkish, e.g. Türk milleti ("Turkish nation"), İngiliz milleti ("English nation"), etc. It also retains its use as a religious and ethnic classification; it can also be used as a slang to classify people belonging to a particular group (not necessarily religious or ethnic), such as dolmuşçu milleti ("minivan taxi drivers people") or kadın milleti ("women folk").

See also 
 Culture of the Ottoman Empire
 History of the Ottoman Empire
 Devşirme system, Ottoman practice of forcibly taking Christian boys in order to be raised to serve the state
 Jizyah, tax levied on non-Muslims based on Islamic law
 Pillarisation, separation of a society into groups by religion and associated political beliefs
 Kadi (Ottoman Empire), Ottoman official and judge
 Qadi, Islamic judge
 Mufti, Islamic jurist

References

Bibliography 
 
 
 
 Ottoman Empire site, German full original version

Further reading 
  - Online on 3 April 2007
  - Published online 2015-12-21
 Benjamin Braude and Bernard Lewis (ed.), Christians and Jews in the Ottoman Empire. The Functioning of a Plural Society, 2 vol., New York and London 1982.
 
 Dimitris Stamatopoulos, "From Millets to Minorities in the 19th – Century Ottoman Empire: an Ambiguous Modernization", in S. G. Ellis, G. Hálfadanarson, A.K. Isaacs (επιμ.), Citizenship in Historical Perspective, Pisa: Edizioni Plus – Pisa University Press, 2006, 253–273
 Elizabeth A. Zachariadou, Co−Existence and Religion, in: Archivum Ottomanicum 15 (1997), 119–29.
 
 
 
 Youssef Courbage and Philippe Fargues, Christians and Jews under Islam, translated by Judy Mabro, London−New York 1997.
 Ramsaur, Ernest Edmondson Jr., The Young Turks. Prelude to the Revolution of 1908, 2. ed., İstanbul 1982, pp. 40–1, Anm. 30: "Meşveret", Paris, 3. Dezember 1895.
 Çağlar Keyder, Bureaucracy and Bourgeoisie: Reform and Revolution in the Age of Imperialism, in: Review, XI, 2, Spring 1988, pp. 151–65.
 Roderic H. Davison, Turkish Attitudes Concerning Christian−Muslim Equality in the Nineteenth Century, in: American Historical Review 59 (1953–54), pp. 844–864.

External links 
 

Arabic words and phrases
Demographics of the Ottoman Empire
Politics of the Ottoman Empire
Religion in the Ottoman Empire
Subdivisions of the Ottoman Empire
Christianity in the Ottoman Empire
Society of the Ottoman Empire
Decentralization